Eldon H. Warkentin (March 16, 1933) was an American politician and businessman.

Warkentin was born in Dolton, Turner County, South Dakota. He lived in Coon Rapids, Minnesota with his wife and family. Warkentin went to University of Minnesota and was a licensed public accountant. Warkentin served in the Minnesota House of Representatives in 1995 and 1996 and was a Republican.

References

1933 births
Living people
People from Coon Rapids, Minnesota
People from Turner County, South Dakota
University of Minnesota alumni
Businesspeople from Minnesota
Republican Party members of the Minnesota House of Representatives